Kolno  is a town in northeastern Poland, located in the Podlaskie Voivodeship, about 150 km northeast of Warsaw. It is the seat of Kolno County, and the seat of the smaller administrative district (gmina) called Gmina Kolno, but it is not part of this district, as the town has gmina status in its own right. Kolno has 10,730 inhabitants (2007).

History

Lechitic (early Polish) settlement developed from the 8th century, and a stronghold was erected in the 8th or 9th century. In the 10th century it became part of the emerging Polish state. As a result of the fragmentation of Piast-ruled Poland, it formed part of the provincial Duchy of Masovia, before it was reincorporated directly to the Polish Crown. Kolno was first mentioned in 1222, and received town rights from Duke Janusz III of Masovia in 1425. Major economic expansion took place in the 16th century, with more trade and crafts. Kolno was a royal town of the Polish Crown, administratively located in the Masovian Voivodeship in the Greater Poland Province of the Polish Crown.

Kolno was destroyed by fire during the Kościuszko Uprising (1794). After the Third Partition of Poland (1795) it became part of Prussia, till 1807, and subsequently, part of the short-lived Polish Duchy of Warsaw. From 1815 it belonged to Congress Poland in the Russian Partition of Poland. In the 19th century, many Jews settled in the town, following Russian discriminatory policies and the expulsion of Jews from Russia to the Russian Partition of Poland (see Pale of Settlement). After the massacres of Polish protesters committed by the Russians in Warsaw in 1861, Polish demonstrations and clashes with Russian soldiers took place in Kolno. Kolno was destroyed again in the First World War, during battle between Russian and German empires.

In 1918, it was eventually reintegrated with Poland, as the country regained independence after the First World War. On 25–26 August 1920, the Battle of Kolno was fought, in which the Polish 14th Infantry Division defeated the invading Soviets. It was the last battle of the large Battle of Warsaw, which definitely halted the Russian advance and the spread of communism westwards into Europe. The population of Kolno during the interwar period increased to 5,163 persons, 70% of them Jewish.

Jan of Kolno
Polish historian and cartographer Joachim Lelewel (1786–1861) was the first to gather all available mentions of Jan of Kolno known as Johannes Scolnus, and claimed that Scolvus was really Jan z Kolna (English: John of Kolno), a Polish navigator of the Danish fleet. He also found mentions of a Joannis de Colno who studied at the Kraków Academy in 1455, and a Colno or Cholno family of merchants and sailors living in Gdańsk.

World War II 
Following the Nazi German and Soviet invasion of Poland, which started World War II, Kolno was taken over by the German forces on 8 September 1939. On 12–13 September 1939, the German Einsatzgruppe V entered the town to commit various crimes against the populace. On 29 September Soviets entered the area in accordance with the Ribbentrop-Molotov Pact. The Soviets carried out mass deportations of the inhabitants to the Soviet Union. Already in 1939, the Polish resistance movement was organized in Kolno by Stanisław Milewski. The town remained under Soviet occupation until Operation Barbarossa (22 June 1941) when it was overrun again by the Wehrmacht.

On 5 1941 Hermann Göring and Erich Koch visited the town, and some 30 to 37 Jews were murdered by the local Poles. The rest of the Jewish population, some 2,350 to 3,000 Jews, were executed by the Germans in several stages beginning on 15 July 1941. Six weeks later, only 80 Jews remained in Kolno, mostly craftsmen and artisans whom the Germans employed.

The leader of the local Polish resistance, Stanisław Milewski, was killed by the Germans in July 1944. The Soviet Army liberated Kolno on the night of 23–24 January 1945 and ceded the town back to Poland, however, with a Soviet-installed communist regime, which remained in power until the Fall of Communism in the 1980s.

Sports
 Orzeł Kolno – football club

Notable persons
 Maria Lani born in Kolno in 1895; in the late 1920s while in Paris portrayed in paintings and sculpture by over fifty notable artists.
 Albert Lewis was a Broadway and film producer who was born to a Jewish family in Kolno and emigrated to the US as a child.
 Pessah Bar-Adon (born Pessah Panitsch) was an archaeologist, who was involved in many excavations in Israel.
 Gertrude Blanch (born Gittel Kaimowitz) was an accomplished Mathematician, who emigrated to the US as a child.
 Nehemiah Samuel Libowitz was a Jewish scholar.
 Joseph Gabowicz was an acclaimed Sculptor.
 Avraham Akavia was a soldier, author and personal aide to Orde Wingate.
 Ze'ev Yavetz was a historian, author, teacher and one of the founders of the Mizrachi movement.
 Isaac Remba was an author, columnist and personal aide to Ze'ev Jabotinsky
 Chaim Brisman was a theatre actor, director and writer, sculptor and painter who was born in Kolno and emigrated to America in 1921.

References

External links

 Kolnoteka.pl – The Digital Archive of the town and district Kolno
 Kolno local government home page
 History of the Jewish community in Kolno by David Sotkowitz and Nathan Apkon

Cities and towns in Podlaskie Voivodeship
Kolno County
Masovian Voivodeship (1526–1795)
Łomża Governorate
Białystok Voivodeship (1919–1939)
Warsaw Voivodeship (1919–1939)
Holocaust locations in Poland